The Deep Bay station is located in Deep Bay, British Columbia. The station was a flag stop on Via Rail's Dayliner service. Service ended in 2011.

Footnotes

External links 
Via Rail Station Description

Via Rail stations in British Columbia
Railway stations closed in 2011
Disused railway stations in Canada